Medellin National Science and Technology School (MNSTS) is a secondary school in Medellin, Cebu in the Philippines.

In its early years of conception, when there were not enough rooms or a building for the students to occupy, lectures were done at the Medellin Central School with the students squatting on the floor. After its furnishing, the new MNSTS building located at the New Medellin Estate Subdivision provided the students a conducive place to study and learn.

The Medellin National Science and Technology School started its operation in School Year 1996-1997 through its founder, Dr. Carolino B. Mordeno. Aside from the required academic subjects in the secondary education, the students are also given additional trainings in difficult subjects like Mathematics and Science with more than an hour of training in each course.

History 
The school was established in 1996 after a resolution was passed by a Medellin municipal councilor that a science school be made in the place, particularly in Poblacion. Local officials then collaborated hand to provide funds for the establishment of the edifice.

The Medellin National Science and Technology School used to be named National Science and Technology School of Medellin. Its establishment in June 1995, with only one teacher installed- Mr. Joel Comendador, a physics teacher was instated, marked the beginning of today’s go-getter school.

Several months later after its establishment, Mrs. Neriza Seares joined. Together, they operated the school which only had 23 and 30 students enrolled in first and second year respectively. They conducted classes under the tree with loose boardsharedharing the same school plant with the Medellin Central School.

After few years, the Local Government Unit of Medellin led by the Municipal Mayor, Manreza P. Lim, in cooperation with Bogo’s former Mayor Clavel A. Martinez, donated a lot to the school which made it able for the DPWH to easily construct five buildings they promised for the school.

In 2000, the school buildings were realized. And in January of the same year, with three teachers, the students transferred to the site.

Currently the school building is located at New Medellin Estate Subdivision, Poblacion, Medellin, Cebu. It is currently headed by Mrs. Socorro Remulta Principal I. As of academic year 2016-2017 it has 15 teachers and 311 enrolled students having 261 Junior High and 50 Senior High Students. The institution also offers the STEM (Science Technology Engineering and Mathematics) strand of the newly implemented K-12 curriculum.

External links
Medellin National Science High School

References
 https://web.archive.org/web/20120723174127/http://202.91.162.20/medellinschool/index.html

Science high schools in the Philippines
High schools in Cebu
Public schools in the Philippines